The year 1916 in architecture involved some significant events.

Buildings and structures

Buildings

 Colony Club at Park Avenue & 62nd Streer in New York City by Delano & Aldrich with interiors by Elsie de Wolfe, later the East Coast school of the American Academy of Dramatic Arts, completed.
 Main building of St Hugh's College, Oxford in England by Herbert Tudor Buckland and William Haywood completed.
 Church of St Paul, Liverpool in England by Giles Gilbert Scott completed.
 Holland House (shipping company offices) in the City of London, designed by Hendrik Petrus Berlage, completed.
 Las Lajas Shrine in Colombia, begun; completed 1949.

Events
 c. November – The Incorporation of Architects in Scotland founded in Edinburgh.
 Publication of the White Pine Series of Architectural Monographs is initiated, continuing until 1940.

Awards
 RIBA Royal Gold Medal – Robert Rowand Anderson.
 Grand Prix de Rome, architecture: not held.

Births

 January 23 – Olaf Andreas Gulbransson, German architect (d. 1961)
 April 4 – Robert S. McMillan, American architect (d. 2001)
 May 4 – Jane Jacobs, American-Canadian urban theorist (d. 2006)
 May 21 – Leonard Manasseh, Singapore-born British architect (d. 2017)
 June 29 – John M. Johansen, American architect (d. 2012)
 July 1 – Lawrence Halprin, American architect (d. 2009)
 August 6 – Dom Mintoff, Maltese architect and Prime Minister (d. 2012)
 November 1 – John C. Harkness, American architect
 November 9 – Richard Tyler, British architect (d. 2009)
 Dewi-Prys Thomas, British architect (d. 1985)

Deaths
 March 22 – Ferdinand Fellner, Austrian architect (b. 1847)
 June – Addison Hutton, American architect (b. 1834)
 July 1 – First Day on the Somme (killed in action)
 Eugene Bourdon, French architect (b. 1870)
 Gilbert Waterhouse, English architect and war poet (b. 1883)
 July 22 – Hans Jørgen Holm, Danish architect (b. 1835)
 October 10 – Antonio Sant'Elia, Italian architect (killed in action) (b. 1888)
 December 22 – Gyula Pártos, Hungarian architect (b. 1845)

References